Shivanarayanpur railway station is a railway station on Sahibganj loop line under the Malda railway division of Eastern Railway zone. It is situated beside National Highway 80 at Mathurapur, Shivnarayanpur in Bhagalpur district in the Indian state of Bihar.

References

Railway stations in Bhagalpur district
Malda railway division